"Almost Grown" is a song written and recorded by Chuck Berry. It was released as a double A-side with "Little Queenie".

Background
The song was released as Chess single 1722, and was later notable when featured in the 1973 film American Graffiti, and on its soundtrack album.

Recording
The song was recorded on February 17, 1959, at Chess Studios in Chicago, Illinois.
 Chuck Berry, vocals and guitar
 Johnnie Johnson on piano
 Willie Dixon on bass
 Fred Below on drums
 The background vocals on Berry's recording are by Etta James and The Marquees aka Harvey & the New Moonglows, featuring the young Marvin Gaye.

Track listing
7" Vinyl
 "Almost Grown"
 "Little Queenie"

Chart performance
The song reached number thirty-two on the Billboard Hot 100 chart and number three on the Billboard R&B chart.

Covers
 The song was covered by The Animals on their 1963 album of the same name.
 Australian band Ol' 55 covered the song on their album Take It Greasy (1976).
 French version by Eddy Mitchell called "C'est la vie, mon chéri" on his album Rocking in Nashville (1974)
 The song has also been covered by The Ivy League and David Bowie

References

Chuck Berry songs
The Animals songs
1959 songs
Chess Records singles
Songs written by Chuck Berry
1959 singles